Schoellkopf is a German surname. Notable people with the surname include:

 Arthur Schoellkopf (1856–1913)
 Henry Schoellkopf (1879–1912)
 Jacob F. Schoellkopf (1819–1899)
 Jacob F. Schoellkopf Jr. (1858-1942)
 Jean-Louis Schoellkopf (born 1946)
 Paul A. Schoellkopf (1884-1947)

See also
 Schoellkopf Field
 Schoellkopf Power Station
 Schoellkopf Geological Museum

German-language surnames